St. Mary's Catholic Church is a parish church of the Apostolic Vicariate of Southern Arabia located in Dubai, United Arab Emirates.

History 
Initially, Catholics in the United Arab Emirates were served by a priest based in Bahrain, but eventually there was need for a resident priest. Prime Minister Rashid bin Saeed Al Maktoum initially granted a plot of land but it was unusable due to its remoteness. Fr Eusebio Daveri then obtained a more accessible plot of land in 1965 and began construction of a church. On 7 April 1967, it was solemnly blessed by the Vicar Apostolic of Southern Arabia Irzio Luigi Magliacani, OFM Cap., and dedicated as the Church of the Assumption.

However, as the number of faithful grew, there was need for a larger church. In 1988, the Church of the Assumption was demolished and replaced with St. Mary's Catholic Church. It was dedicated on 3 November 1989 by Cardinal Jozef Tomko, Prefect of the Congregation for the Evangelisation of Peoples.
Today St. Mary's Catholic Church has over 350,000 parishioners from different nationalities.

See also 
Roman Catholicism in the United Arab Emirates

References

External links

Roman Catholic churches in the United Arab Emirates
Churches in Dubai
Christian organizations established in 1969
Catholic missions
Roman Catholic churches completed in 1988
Apostolic Vicariate of Southern Arabia
Catholic Church in the Arabian Peninsula